Matrix metalloproteinase 15 also known as MMP15 is an enzyme that in humans is encoded by the MMP15 gene.

Function 

Proteins of the matrix metalloproteinase (MMP) family are involved in the breakdown of extracellular matrix in normal physiological processes, such as embryonic development, reproduction, and tissue remodeling, as well as in disease processes, such as arthritis and metastasis. Most MMP's are secreted as inactive proenzymes which are activated when cleaved by extracellular proteinases. However, the protein encoded by this gene is a member of the membrane-type MMP (MT-MMP) subfamily; members of this subfamily can be anchored to the extracellular membrane by either a transmembrane domain or glycophosphatidylinositol linkage, suggesting that these proteins are expressed at the cell surface rather than secreted in a soluble form.

References

Further reading

External links
 The MEROPS online database for peptidases and their inhibitors: M10.015

Matrix metalloproteinases
EC 3.4.24